The Simons Observatory is located in the high Atacama Desert in Northern Chile inside the Chajnator Science Preserve, at an altitude of 5,200 meters (17,000 ft). The Atacama Cosmology Telescope (ACT) and the Simons Array are located nearby and these experiments are currently making observations of the Cosmic Microwave Background (CMB). Their goals are to study how the universe began, what it is made of, and how it evolved to its current state. The Simons Observatory shares many of the same goals but aims to take advantage of advances in technology to make far more precise and diverse measurements.  In addition, it is envisaged that many aspects of the Simons Observatory (optical designs, detector technologies and so on) will be pathfinders for the future CMB-S4 array.

The Simons Observatory has been made possible by a combined $40.1 million grant from the Simons Foundation and a number of participating universities.  The Collaboration is large and multinational with over 250 scientists at over 35 institutions across the world.

Science goals 
One of the primary goals of the Simons Observatory are polarization maps of the sky with an order of magnitude better sensitivity than the Planck satellite.  These will enable better measurement of cosmological parameters and will also enable a wide range of other science.  Examples include gravitational lensing of the microwave background, the primordial bispectrum, and the thermal and kinematic Sunyaev-Zel'dovich effects. With delensing the large-angle polarization signal it will be possible to measure the tensor-to-scalar ratio. The survey will also provide a legacy catalog of 16,000 galaxy clusters and more than 20,000 extragalactic sources.  Details have been published in a forecasts paper.

Frequencies 
The CMB peaks at a frequency of 160.3 GHz.  At and just below this frequency the atmospheric opacity is low.  As a result, the majority of the Simons Observatory's detectors will operate from 90 to 150 GHz.

However, critical to sensitive measurements is coverage at other frequencies in order to remove foregrounds such as emission from our galaxy.  Since these foregrounds have a different spectrum to the CMB by using higher and lower frequencies it is possible to separate them out.  The exact band centers used by the Simons Observatory are 27, 39, 93, 145, 225 and 280 GHz.

Telescopes 
To achieve a high enough angular resolution for some of the science goals, a telescope with an aperture larger than about 5 meters is needed.  To reduce systematic effects which become the dominate source of errors in very low noise maps, the Simons Observatory will build a 6-meter telescope and under illuminate the primary mirror to 5.5 meters.  At the same time other science goals require very low noise on large angular scales—something a 6-meter telescope will struggle to achieve.  For this reason the Simons observatory will also build three 0.5 meter telescopes and combine the data sets in analysis.

The Large Aperture Telescope (LAT) 
The 6 meter diameter telescope has a Crossed Dragone design. At a frequency of 90 GHz it has a field-of-view over 7.8 degrees.  Currently it is under construction by Vertex Antennentechnik in Germany.  This telescope is of an identical design to the higher frequency CCAT-prime telescope which is also under construction.

The detectors on the LAT will be housed in a single large cryostat over 2.4 meters in diameter.  This will house up to 13 optics tubes consisting of three cooled silicon lenses (to refocus light from the secondary focus of the telescope onto the detectors) and a Lyot stop at an image of the primary mirror (to prevent stray light from the telescope structure reaching the detectors).  One of these 13 tubes will operate at 27 & 39 GHz, four will operate at 93 & 145 GHz, two at 225 & 280 GHz and the rest are reserved for future expansion.  This cryostat will be one of the largest millimeter-wave astronomical cameras ever built.

The Small Aperture Telescopes (SATs) 
The small aperture telescopes are refracting telescopes with 3 aspheric silicon lenses and a rotating half wave plate.  Each telescope has a field-of-view of over 35 degrees.  Overcoming systematic effects, such as picking up signals from the ground in sidelobes, are critical to the measurement of the very largest angular scales so each telescope has co-moving screens and is mounted inside a fixed ground screen that reflects diffraction from the co-moving screens to the sky.

Detectors 
The Simons Observatory will use Transition Edge Sensor (TES) bolometers.  These devices will be cooled to 100 mK inside cryostats using pulse tube coolers to cool to below 4 Kelvin and dilution refrigerators for the final 1 K and 100 mK cooling stages.  Approximately 60,000 bolometers with roughly half on the LAT and the rest on the SATs.  To readout the detectors a microwave multiplexing scheme will be used.

Current status 
As of November 2019, none of the 4 telescopes are completed or at the site in Chile.  However, final designs exist and construction will start shortly.  A geological survey of the observatory site has been completed and preparations for installing site infrastructure (power, roads, internet, buildings) have started.  The cryostats for all the telescopes have been built and initial thermal tests are being carried out.
Three of the telescopes are expected to be accepted in December 2022.

See also
 List of astronomical observatories

References

Astronomical observatories in Chile
Cosmic microwave background experiments